Cam F. Awesome (born August 6, 1988 in Uniondale, New York), formerly known as Lenroy Thompson, is an American amateur boxer best known for winning the US title in 2008, 2010, 2013 and 2014 and the Golden Gloves in 2009, 2011 and 2013 at super heavyweight.

He is featured in the 2017 Netflix boxing documentary, Counter Puncher. He frequently fights in pink to show his commitment to and involvement with the Breast Cancer Awareness Program. Awesome is the U.S. National Team Captain and is also the Athlete Director on USA Boxing Board of Directors. He is a vegan since 2012 and promotes the lifestyle. He now tours the nation educating students on cultural awareness.

Amateur boxing career 
Awesome is a Southpaw that fights with a counterpuncher style. He first started boxing in 2005 to lose weight. A few months later he moved to Port St. Lucie, Florida, where he continued to box for Fort Pierce P.A.L. and won 18 consecutive matches in the super heavyweight class.

In 2012 he was suspended for a year by the United States Anti-Doping Agency for multiple failures to provide his location in order to be available for drug testing.  On his return from the suspension, he legally changed his name to "Cam F. Awesome" and resumed his pursuit of the 2016 Olympic Games in Rio de Janeiro, where he became a leading frontrunner to represent the United States as a super-heavyweight.  He lost to Lenier Pero at the 2015 Pan American Games but was noted for his energetic performance during the bout and in post-fight interviews, where he gained attention for calling himself "the Taylor Swift of boxing".

At the U.S. Olympic team trials in December 2015, he won the 201-pound weight class. However, due to his international ranking, this only qualified him for the 2016 APB and WSB Olympic Qualifier where he was eliminated in the quarterfinals.

He lives and trains in Lenexa, Kansas.

Boxing record; 62-18

See also  
 List of vegans

References

External links 

 
 
 
 

1988 births
Living people
American male boxers
Heavyweight boxers
National Golden Gloves champions
Pan American Games medalists in boxing
Pan American Games bronze medalists for the United States
Boxers at the 2015 Pan American Games
People from Lenexa, Kansas
People from Uniondale, New York
Boxers from New York (state)
Medalists at the 2015 Pan American Games